Meredith L. Clausen (born 1942) is an American architectural historian, and professor in the School of Art and the Department of Architecture at the University of Washington in Seattle, Washington, USA.  She is known for research and writing on American architect Pietro Belluschi and on Art Nouveau architecture.

Clausen graduated with a B.A. from Scripps College, Claremont, California, and went on to earn her M.A. (in 1972) and Ph.D. (in 1975) at the University of California, Berkeley.  She has taught at the University of Washington since 1979.

Awards
Her book, Spiritual Space received a Washington State Governor's Writer's Award in 1993.

Writings
 Clausen, Meredith, Frantz Jourdain and the Samaritaine: Art Nouveau Theory and Criticism, E. J. Brill, Leiden 1987; 
 Clausen, Meredith, The Pan Am Building and the Shattering of the Modernist Dream, MIT Press, Cambridge MA and London 2005;  
 Clausen, Meredith, Pietro Belluschi: Modern American Architect, MIT Press, Cambridge MA and London 1994;  
 Clausen, Meredith, Spiritual Space: The Religious Architecture of Pietro Belluschi. University of Washington Press, Seattle and London 1992;

Notes

1942 births
Living people
American architecture writers
American architectural historians
University of California, Berkeley alumni
University of Washington faculty
Writers from Seattle
American women historians
Historians from Washington (state)